The Senate of Serampore College (University) is located in Serampore in West Bengal, India. Serampore was granted the status of university by King Frederick VI of Denmark in 1829.

The college was founded by the missionaries Joshua Marshman, William Carey and William Ward (the Serampore trio), to give an education in arts and sciences to students of every "caste, colour, creed or country" and to train a ministry for the growing Church in India.

History

Since Serampore was then a Danish colony, King Frederick VI, the King of Denmark, issued Serampore College its Royal Charter of Incorporation on 23 February 1827, in Copenhagen, Denmark (Charter, 1, Charter, 2, Charter, 3).  The charter came in response to Joshua Marshman's visit to King Frederick in August 1826; the charter gave Serampore College the privilege of awarding degrees in Arts and Theology. Baptist missionaries William Carey, Joshua Marshman, and John Clark Marshman (Joshua's son) were designated as members of the first Council. At its opening, the Trio released a prospectus which proposed "A College for the instruction of Asiatic Christian and other Youth in Eastern Literature and European Science." The college was open to all persons of any caste or creed, and the founders ensured that no denominational test would apply to faculty members. 

After 22 February 1845 when Denmark sold all of its Indian assets to Britain, the management and operation of the college continued without interruption under the direction of a master and council.  In 1856 the Baptist Missionary Society in England took over the management of the college and, in 1857, the college became affiliated with the newly established University of Calcutta and became a constituent college of that university. In 1883 the college closed as an arts college and began functioning as a Christian Training Institution and a theological institute for the Baptist churches in Bengal.

The Royal charter has also been confirmed by the Bengal Govt Act. IV of 1918.

Authority to issue degrees and accreditation
The theological degrees awarded by the Senate of Serampore College are  not accredited by any agency and are not  legally recognized  under Section 22 of  the UGC Act hence it is not recognised by Indian  universities and government.

The Senate of Serampore draws its power to award degree from the Royal Charter awarded by King Frederick VI of Denmark, giving the Senate of Serampore College the status of a degree granting university. Through the Danish Charter, Serampore became  the first institution in India to be given the status of a university. It confers its own degrees in Theology under the power vested by the Charter and Act of Serampore College.

Senate of Serampore is not accredited by any external agency or association. National Assessment and Accreditation Council has given its accreditation for secular degree programs of Serampore College which is awarded through the affiliation of University of Calcutta.

Degrees awarded
Presently, the Senate of Serampore College (University) restricts itself to award of degrees pertaining to theology.

The following are the degrees awarded to students through its affiliated colleges throughout India, Nepal, Bangladesh, and Sri Lanka:

Internal

Graduate programmes
Bachelor of Divinity (B.D)
Bachelor of Theology (B.Th)
 Bachelor of Missiology (B.Miss)

Postgraduate programmes
Master of Theology (M.Th)
Masters in Counselling and Psychotherapy (MCP)

Doctoral programmes
Doctor of Theology (D.Th)

External

Diploma programmes
Diploma in Christian Studies (Dip. C.S.)
Diploma in Clinical Pastoral Counselling (Dip.C.P.C.)
Diploma in Bible translation (Dip B.T)

Graduate programmes
Bachelor of Christian Studies (B.C.S.)

Postgraduate programmes
Master of Ministry (M.Min.)
 Master of Christian Studies (MCS)

Doctoral programmes
Doctor of Ministry (D.Min.)
Doctor of Theology (Th.D)

Constituent colleges
Serampore College (Theology Department), Serampore
South Asia Theological Research Institute, Serampore

Affiliated colleges

Other affiliated centres
Affiliated centres as of 2014 for the purpose of Diploma in Clinical Pastoral Counselling.
Karnataka
Christian Medical Association of India, Bangalore
Kerala
Life Enrichment Counselling and Training Centre, Idukki district
Mar Thoma Hospital Guidance, Trivandrum
T. M. A. Institute of Counselling, Kottayam
Tamil Nadu
Christian Medical College, Vellore, Vellore

References

External links

 
Universities in Kolkata
Christian seminaries and theological colleges in India
Academic institutions associated with the Bengal Renaissance
Christianity in Kolkata
19th century in Kolkata
Schools in Colonial India
Educational institutions established in 1818
Educational institutions established in 1827
1818 establishments in British India
1820s establishments in British India